Chokai Dam is a trapezoidal dam located in Akita Prefecture in Japan. The dam is used for flood control, water supply and power production. The catchment area of the dam is 83.9 km2. The dam impounds about 310  ha of land when full and can store 46800 thousand cubic meters of water. The construction of the dam was started on 1993 .

References

Dams in Akita Prefecture
1993  establishments in Japan